Radio Total was a radio station broadcasting in Bucharest on 96.9 MHz, launched on 21 December 1993. 

As of 27 October 2008 the former Radio Total was rebranded as Radio Gold FM.

 Defunct radio stations in Romania
Mass media in Bucharest

ro:Radio Total